The Familiar is a 2009 comedy horror short film starring Torrance Coombs, Paul Hubbard and Rachel Sehl.  It tells the story of a naive vampire fan who becomes the personal assistant to a belligerent vampire.  It won awards at the Sitges Film Festival, Bram Stoker International Film Festival, Charleston International Film Festival, the Rincon International Film Festival, the Seattle True Independent Film Festival and the River Bend Film Festival.  It has been nominated for several Leo Awards as well as Best Short Film at the DGC Awards.

Plot
Sam (Torrance Coombs) has always been obsessed with vampires from the time he was a child watching them on children’s programs to when he was a college student reading horror novels on the side.
On Sam’s 21st birthday, a mysterious gentleman offers him a peculiar career choice: become an assistant to a real-life Vampire. Intrigued and enthusiastic, Sam takes the job and meets Simon Bolivar (Paul Hubbard), a 400-year-old Vampire.
Everything about the Vampire does hold some truth to it; a truth followed by a dose of hard-reality.  Sam soon realizes that it is not so cool or pleasant to serve his corrupt and neurotic behavior.

Cast

Inspiration
Kody Zimmermann came up with the idea reading Dracula while working as an actor's assistant: "I felt like...the vampire was a metaphor for the boss from hell.  I was always interested in the Renfield character in Dracula, and no one ever really did his story – that I know of.  What kind of a person would devote himself to this sinister, Satanic agent and still call himself a human being?  I thought that was the connection – you are crazy for being part of this world, but you are not exactly the main character, either.  I wanted to bridge those two things, and I think it fit well while I was writing it: serving this greater being while being caught up in this insanity.  A lot of us go into these jobs where we ask ourselves, 'why are we doing this'".

Awards

Wins
2010: HorrorQuest Film Festival for Best Short Film
2010: Sitges Film Festival Official Fantastic Competition Panorama for Best Short Film
2010: Vampire Film Festival for Outstanding Vampire Short
2010: Buffalo Screams Horror Film Festival for Best Horror Short Film
2010: Buffalo Screams Horror Film Festival for Best Screenplay
2010: Mile High Horror Film Festival Audience Award for Best Short Film
2010: Thriller! Chiller! Film Festival Best Short Film
2010: Bram Stoker International Film Festival for Best Short Film
2010: Maelstrom International Fantasy Film Festival for Audience Favorite Best Horror Short Film
2010: Action/Cut Short Film Competition for Best Fiction Film
2010: Seattle's True Independent Film Festival (STIFF) Fangbanger Award
2010: River Bend International Film Festival Hight Point Award
2010: Rincón International Film Festival for Best Horror Short
2010: Charleston International Film Festival for Best Short Thriller

Nominations
2011: Killer Film Festival for Best Screenplay (Kody Zimmermann)
2011: New Orleans Horror Film Festival for Best Screenplay (Kody Zimmermann)
2011: New Orleans Horror Film Festival for Best Horror Short
2010: Buffalo Screams Horror Film Festival for Best Director (Kody Zimmermann)
2010: Buffalo Screams Horror Film Festival for Best Cinematography (George Campbell)
2010: Buffalo Screams Horror Film Festival for Best Actor (Torrance Coombs)
2010: Buffalo Screams Horror Film Festival for Best Actor (Paul Hubbard)
2010: Terror Film Festival for Best Horror Short Film
2010: Action On Film International Film Festival for Best Make-Up
2010: Directors Guild of Canada Award for Best Short Film
2010: Leo Award for Best Screenplay in a Short Drama (Kody Zimmermann)
2010: Leo Award for Best Overall Sound in a Short Drama (Hugo Dela Cerda, Kevin Belen, David Green)
2010: Leo Award for Best Sound Editing in a Short Drama (Kelly Cole, Bill Mellow, Kevin Belen, Graeme Hughes, David Green)
2010: Leo Award for Best Performance Male Lead in a Short Drama (Torrance Coombs)

References

External links
 
 

2009 short films
2009 films
English-language Canadian films
2009 horror films
Canadian comedy short films
Vampire comedy films
Cultural depictions of Simón Bolívar
Canadian vampire films
2000s English-language films
Canadian horror short films
2000s Canadian films